Boundary Creek may refer to:

In Australia
 Boundary Creek (Glen Fernaigh River, Clarence Valley), a tributary of the Glen Fernaigh River in the Clarence Valley of New South Wales, Australia
 Boundary Creek (Homebush Bay, New South Wales), a tributary of the Parramatta River in Sydney, New South Wales, Australia
 Boundary Creek (Nymboida River, Clarence Valley), a tributary of the Nymboida River in the Clarence Valley of New South Wales, Australia

In Canada
 Boundary Creek (British Columbia), a watercourse in British Columbia, Canada

In the United States
 Boundary Creek (Madera County, California)
Boundary Creek Wildlife Management Area, a wilderness area in Idaho

Multi-national
 Boundary Creek (St. Mary River), a stream in Alberta, Canada and Montana, US